Eilema flavibasis is a moth of the subfamily Arctiinae. It was described by George Hampson in 1900. It is found in Ethiopia, Kenya and South Africa.

References

flavibasis
Moths described in 1900
Moths of Africa